José María Buljubasich (born 12 May 1971 in Firmat, Argentina) is a former Argentine football player who played as a goalkeeper in Argentina, Spain, Mexico, Chile and Paraguay.  He won two titles, one in Argentina and the other in Chile.

Biography
He was born in Firmat in the province of Santa Fe, Argentina. He was the main goalkeeper for River Plate in 2003, a year in which the team won the Torneo de Clausura having as coach the international coach of Manchester City, Manuel Pellegrini.

In 2005, Buljubasich maintained a clean record of 1352 minutes without allowing a goal, this record put him in fourth place in the world according to the IFFHS. That year, Buljubasich won the Torneo de Clausura keeping a penalty off in the penalty kick-out; he was one of the best players of the Copa Sudamericana of that year.

In 2006, in the second semester the doctors of Universidad Católica found a tumour on "Tati"'s brain; he missed the rest of the 2006 season; but anyhow the operation was successfully done and he was allowed to play on the 2007-08 season.

On December 30, 2008 José Marías Buljubasich leaves Universidad Católica because he could not reach an agreement with the directives of the Club.

Buljubasich moved to Olimpia of Paraguay for the 2009 Apertura tournament.

After an irregular 2009 Buljubasich decide it was time to retire from professional football. He played his last match of his career in a 3–1 loss to Guarani.

He currently has his residence in Santiago, Chile

Honours

Club
Universidad Católica
 Primera División de Chile (1): 2005 Clausura

External links
IFFHS Top 350 goalkeeping shutouts
La Catolica player profile

References

1971 births
Living people
Argentine footballers
Argentine expatriate footballers
Argentine people of Croatian descent
Association football goalkeepers
Rosario Central footballers
La Liga players
CD Tenerife players
Real Oviedo players
UE Lleida players
Club Atlético Los Andes footballers
Atlético Morelia players
Club Atlético River Plate footballers
People from General López Department
Unión Española footballers
Club Deportivo Universidad Católica footballers
Club Olimpia footballers
Chilean Primera División players
Argentine Primera División players
Liga MX players
Argentine expatriate sportspeople in Chile
Expatriate footballers in Chile
Expatriate footballers in Paraguay
Expatriate footballers in Mexico
Expatriate footballers in Spain
Argentine expatriate sportspeople in Mexico
Argentine expatriate sportspeople in Spain
Sportspeople from Santa Fe Province